The men's coxless pairs competition at the 1952 Summer Olympics took place at Mei Bay, Helsinki, Finland.

Schedule

Results

Heats
First boat of each heat qualified to the semifinal, remainder goes to the repechage.

Heat 1

Heat 2

Heat 3

Heat 4

Repechage
First boat of each heat qualified to the semifinal.

Heat 1

Heat 2

Semifinal
First boat of each heat qualified to the final, remainder goes to the repechage.

Heat 1

Heat 2

Semifinal repechage
First boat of each heat qualified to the final.

Heat 1

Heat 2

Heat 3

Final

References

External links
 Official Olympic Report

Rowing at the 1952 Summer Olympics